Daniel Picouly (born 21 October 1948 in Villemomble) is a French writer.

Picouly was reared in a family of 13 children. His parents were born in the French overseas territory of Martinique.
He became a professor of economics in Paris.

In 1992 he published his first novel, The Light of fools, with the help of Daniel Pennac. He had a great success in 1995, with The Field of people. In this book, as in many others, he recounts his childhood in a novel. He played himself  in the film Imposture (2005).

He was the host of a cultural program on France 5, Café Picouly. From September 2008 to June 2009, he presented  on France 2, before returning to France 5 in September 2009 with its Café Picouly.

He is a jury member on Le Prince Maurice and RFO prizes.

Bibliography
 La lumière des fous (The Light of fools), 1992; Iuniverse.Com, 1999, 
NEC, le Grand livre du mois, 1996
Les larmes des chefs, 1994;  Gallimard, 2004, 
Le champ de personne (Nobody's fields), Flammarion, 1995, Grand prix des lectrices de Elle
Cauchemar Pirate (Pirate's Nightmare), 1995
Vive Noël! (Merry Christmas!), 1995
Lutteur de Sumo (Sumo fighter), 1996
Paris, rive noire, Editions Autrement, 1996, 
Fort de l'eau, Flammarion, 1997, 

Le 13è but, Hoëbeke, 1998,  
La coupe du monde n'aura pas lieu, 1998
Tête de Nègre, 1998; J'ai lu, 2004, 
L'enfant léopard: roman, Librairie générale française, 1999,  
On lit trop dans ce pays (we read too must in this country), Rue du monde, 2000, 
Paulette et Roger, Librairie générale française, 2003, 
La Donzelle: Un bâton rouge dans le chargeur, Editions du Rocher 2004, 
Un beau jeudi pour tuer Kennedy, 2005; Grasset & Fasquelle, 2006, 
Le coeur à la craie: roman, Librairie générale française, 2007, 
La treizième mort du chevalier: roman, Librairie générale française, 2006, 
Un bâton de rouge dans le chargeur: roman, Rocher, 2004, 
Le coeur de craie 2005; Librairie générale française, 2007, 
68, mon amour: roman,Grasset, 2008,

Children's books
Lulu Vroumette, 2002; Magnard, 2005, 
Hondo mène l'enquête: Trois énigmes pocières: Cauchemar pirate; Le lutteur de sumo; La coupe du monde n'aura pas lieu, Flammarion, 2002, 
Retour de flammes (Backdraft), Illustrator	José Muñoz, Casterman, 2003,  
L'arche de Lulu, Magnard jeunesse, 2003, 
Lulu et le sapin orphelin, Magnard, 2004, 
Lulu et le loup bleu, Illustrator Frédéric Pillot, Magnard jeunesse, 2004, 
Lulu a un amoureux, Magnard jeunesse, 2005, 
Lumières d'enfance: La journée d'un enfant dans le monde, Michel Lafon, 2005, 
Le cirque de Lulu, Magnard jeunesse, 2006, 
La maîtresse de Lulu a disparu, Illustrator Frédéric Pillot, Magnard jeunesse, 2006, 
Lulu, présidente!, Illustrator Frédéric Pillot, Magnard Jeunesse, 2007, 
Lulu et la cigogne étourdie, Magnard jeunesse, 2007, 

Lulu et l'ours pyjama, Illustrator Frédéric Pillot, Magnard, 2008, 
Lulu princesse, Illustrator Frédéric Pillot, Magnard jeunesse, 2008, 
Lulu et le dernier des dodos, Magnard, 2009, 
La cuisine de Lulu la gourmande, Magnard, 2010,

Awards received
1996 Elle Reader's Prize for Le champ de personne
1999 Prix Renaudot for L'enfant Léopard
2005 Prix des Romancières for Le Cœur à la craie

References

External links
Author's website

French people of Martiniquais descent
French children's writers
French crime fiction writers
French comics writers
Prix Renaudot winners
Paris 2 Panthéon-Assas University alumni
French male writers
People from Villemomble
1948 births
Living people